Izata Canton is one of the cantons of the Tarata Municipality, the first municipal section of the Esteban Arce Province in the Cochabamba Department in central Bolivia. Its seat is Izata.

References 

  Instituto Nacional de Estadistica de Bolivia  (INE)

External links
 Population data and map of Tarata Municipality

Cantons of Cochabamba Department
Cantons of Bolivia